Sanborn's big-eared bat (Micronycteris sanborni) is a bat species found in Bolivia and Brazil.

References

Bats of South America
Bats of Brazil
Micronycteris
Mammals described in 1996